Podocarpus lawrencei is a species of podocarp native throughout the Australian high country, from southern Tasmania through to the New South Wales highlands. Common names are Errinundra plum-pine and mountain plum-pine (though it is neither a pine nor a plum). It grows on exposed sites to 1,800 m, often forming living carpets over rocks through wind pruning.

Mountain plum-pine can live up to 600 years, and the growth rings vary with the temperature of the growing season, with narrower rings indicating unusually snowy years. These factors make it useful for determining past climate conditions in the Australian Alps.

Description
The leaves are 1 cm long and 2–3 mm broad, green, often reddish-tinted, particularly so in cold winter weather. It has small bright red berry-like cones, with a 5–10 mm long red aril and one (rarely two) apical seeds 6–8 mm long; they are eaten by birds and marsupials, but are toxic to most other mammals (including humans).

Whilst it is normally low growing, rarely reaching more than 1 m in the Australian Alps, on the Errinundra Plateau in eastern Victoria it reaches 15 m in height. The timber is too rare to be used for woodcrafts.

Cultivation
Mountain plum-pine is tolerant of quite dry conditions and can resprout after losing all its leaves from drought. It survives −16 °C to 45 °C and grows well in full sun or fairly heavy shade. It is slow growing, putting on about 3–5 cm of length each year. It can be grown from cuttings or seed. New foliage is usually a lime green, darkening to olive green as it hardens.

Ideally the mountain plum-pine should be grown in full sunlight with plenty of water. It makes a good indoor plant in a bright window. It is an excellent bonsai or hedging plant, although it does require patience.

References

External links
Farjon, A. 2001. World Checklist and Bibliography of Conifers. 2nd edition. The Royal Botanic Gardens, Kew.
 

lawrencei
Flora of New South Wales
Flora of Tasmania
Flora of Victoria (Australia)
Pinales of Australia
Trees of Australia
Trees of mild maritime climate
Ornamental trees
Least concern flora of Australia
Taxa named by Joseph Dalton Hooker